Mihai Flamaropol (9 April 1919 – 30 June 1985) was a Romanian footballer, ice hockey player and coach and a writer. Flamaropol started playing football at Gloria București when he was 12 years old and at 17 he started to play ice hockey at Telefon Club București. He competed in both sports until he retired from football at age 35, but continued to play ice hockey until he was 40 years old. The Mihai Flamaropol Skating Rink from București is named in his honor.

Football career
Mihai Flamaropol made his Divizia A debut on 10 May 1940, playing for Juventus București under coach Coloman Braun-Bogdan in a 5–2 home victory in which he scored a goal against UD Reșița. In his following game in the league he managed to score again in a 3–1 loss against Unirea Tricolor București, however at the end of his first season spent at Juventus, the club relegated to Divizia B, but Flamaropol stayed with the club, scoring 6 goals in 14 matches from the 1940–41 Divizia B season, helping the club promote back to the first division after one year. In 1952 he went to play for CCA București for two seasons, winning the championship in both seasons, at the first contributing with 3 goals in 7 appearances and at the second he played 8 matches and scored one goal. Flamaropol made his last Divizia A appearance on 17 May 1953, playing for CCA București in a 4–0 victory against Locomotiva Timișoara, having a total of 48 goals scored in 118 matches in the competition.

He also played four matches for Romania's national team, making his debut under coach Iuliu Baratky on 20 June 1948 in a 1948 Balkan Cup match which ended with a 3–2 home victory against Bulgaria, a game in which he was sent off in the 74th minute. His following game was also at the 1948 Balkan Cup in which he replaced Andrei Mercea in the 77th minute of a 2–1 home victory against Czechoslovakia. Flamaropol's last two appearances for the national team were friendlies, the first one being a 6–0 victory against Albania, this being the only game in which he played all the minutes for the national team and his last appearance took place on 20 May 1951 in which he was replaced at half-time by Gheorghe Băcuț in a 2–2 against Czechoslovakia.

Ice hockey career
He started his ice hockey career in 1936 at Telefon Club București. Because Telefon Club dissolved its hockey team, in 1940 he transferred to new founded club Rapid București which he captained at age 21 in the winning of the 1940 league. After that season Rapid's ice hockey section was dissolved so he went to play for Juventus București until 1952, when he went at CCA București. At CCA he was a player-coach and managed to win 5 Romanian Hockey Leagues. He was also a national team player. He ended his playing career in 1959, but continued to coach at Știința București, Constructorul, Dinamo București and Romania's ice hockey national team.

Writing
Mihai Flamaropol wrote a total of seven volumes, all of them being about football and ice hockey:
 Hochei pe gheață (Ice hockey) (1962)
 50 de ani de hochei în România (50 years of hockey in Romania) (1976)
 Amintiri din fotbal și hochei (Memories from football and hockey) (1981)
 Fotbal (Football) (1984)
 Fotbal – cadran mondial (Football – world dial) (1984)
 Fotbal – cadran românesc (Football – Romanian dial) (1986)
 Însemnările unui sportiv (The marks of a sportsman)

Honours

Footballer
Juventus București
Divizia B: 1940–41
CCA București
Divizia A: 1952, 1953
Cupa României: 1952

Ice hockey player
Telefon Club București
Romanian Hockey League: 1937
Rapid București
Romanian Hockey League: 1940
Juventus București
Romanian Hockey League: 1941, 1942, 1945, 1946, 1947
CCA București
Romanian Hockey League: 1953, 1955, 1956, 1958, 1959

Ice hockey coach
CCA București
Romanian Hockey League: 1953, 1955, 1956, 1958, 1959

Notes

References

External links

Mihai Flamaropol at Labtof.ro

1919 births
1985 deaths
Romanian footballers
Romania international footballers
Association football forwards
Liga I players
Liga II players
FC Petrolul Ploiești players
FC Steaua București players
Romanian ice hockey players
Steaua Rangers players
Romanian writers
20th-century Romanian writers
Romanian male writers
20th-century Romanian male writers